Emergence is the second release by contemporary classical chamber orchestra Symphony Number One. The album was released on March 4, 2016. An EP, the album has only two tracks totaling less than 30 minutes. The two tracks comprise the two-movement Concerto for Alto Saxophone and Small Chamber Orchestra by Andrew Boss. The concerto was recorded at the season opener of Symphony Number One’s Inaugural Season. The album was recognized on Icareifyoulisten’s Mixtape #20 and twice featured on MPT’s Artworks.

Track listing

Personnel
Symphony Number One

 Sarah Eckman McIver – flute
 Emily Madsen – oboe
 James Duncan – clarinet
 Melissa Johnson Lander – clarinet
 Kika Wright – bassoon
 Selena Maytum – horn
 Nehemiah Russell – percussion
 Elizabeth G. Hill – piano
 Michelle Rofrano – keyboard
 Nicholas Bentz – violin
 Christopher Ciampoli – violin
 Dorothy Couper – viola
 Joe Isom – cello
 Kassie Ferrero – Double bass
 Jordan Randall Smith – conductor

Additional musicians

 Anna Bross – viola
 Christopher Salvito – percussion

Technical personnel

 Dan Rorke – producer
 Arun Ravendhran – engineer
 Chelsea Clough – photographer (cover)
 Maitreyi Muralidharan – photographer (liner)

References

External links 

2016 albums
Symphony Number One albums